"Big Fun" is a song by American electronic music group Inner City. The single went to number-one on the dance chart in the U.S. for one week, and was the first of five releases by the band to reach the top spot. "Big Fun" also peaked at number fifty on the American R&B singles chart. It was also a top-ten hit in the UK.

"Big Fun" was described as a "surprise crossover success" in the United Kingdom by AllMusic.

Impact and legacy

LA Weekly listed "Big Fun" at number 7 in their list of The 20 Best Dance Music Tracks In History in 2015, adding,

""Big Fun" was electronic dance music's first pop moment. But beyond its obvious commercial impact, “Big Fun” was also a milestone in the way it mixed a catchy lead vocal and synth hook with what was essentially a techno backing track. Electronic dance music, for better or worse, would never again be a wholly underground phenomenon."

Mixmag ranked it as one of The 30 best vocal house anthems ever in 2018, stating that the song "marries Paris Grey’s celebratory vocals with Kevin Saunderson’s vibrant production that’s packed full of fun flourishes. One of the most surefire party-starters in the crate of any DJ."

British public service broadcaster BBC included the song in their ranking of 30 tracks that shaped dance music over the last 30 years in 2019. They noted,

"As one of house music’s most infectious crossover hits Big Fun was a hit for young dancers and older ravers alike. It transformed dance music from something found in club basements to a genre that could move an entire nation."

Other versions and homages
The song was sampled (and backmasked) in “Just a Techno Groove” by Frank De Wulf under his projects Sounds In Order/Dow Jones in 1989.
German DJ and remixer Gardeweg used portions of this song, along with Inner City's other two singles, "Good Life" and "Paradise," for his 2003 single "All I Want".
At the end of 2014, a new version was recorded by D.O.N.S. and Terri B! on Carrillo Records. This version peaked at number one on the US dance chart.
Rick Astley's 1988 UK top 10 single "Take Me To Your Heart" was heavily inspired by "Big Fun", according to its writer and producer Matt Aitken, who described the track as "a homage", before adding, "You can't copyright a synth pattern."

Charts

Weekly charts

Year-end charts

See also
 List of number-one dance singles of 1988 (U.S.)
 List of number-one dance singles of 2015 (U.S.)

References

1988 songs
1988 debut singles
2015 singles
Inner City (band) songs
Songs written by Kevin Saunderson
Songs written by Paris Grey